The Sanam Luang National Dhamma Studies Examination Curriculum is a three tier system used throughout Thailand for training in theoretical knowledge about Buddhism. The curriculum is run in tandem with the nine-tiered Pahrian Thamm curriculum for Pali Studies. The curriculum offers two slightly different sets of examination papers 
Nak Thamm designed for the ordained Sangha i.e. Buddhist monks, novices and nuns) 
Thammaseuksa designed for lay Buddhists. 

Tuition for the Nak Thamm and Thammaseuksa curricula and the examinations themselves take place throughout Thailand annually. Thammaseuksa tuition and examinations are also held in some Thai temples outside Thailand.

Origins
The Dhamma Studies examination system was introduced by King Mongkut (Rama IV) during the time he was ordained as a monk Bhikkhu Vajirañāṇo before he succeeded to the throne with the objective that monks could learn about monastic conduct more conveniently by studying translations of it in Thai language rather than Pali. He started writing Nak Thamm texts since the time he became abbot of Wat Bovornives in 1892. The examination system became more widespread as of 1905 because new laws exempted novices from military service if they had nak thamm qualifications. The first centralized examinations were held on 27 March 1911 at Wat Bovornives, Wat Mahathat Yuwaratrangsarit and Wat Benchamabophit. The following year, the curriculum reached its present quad-partite form of Dhamma analysis [dhammavipaaka], life of the Buddha [buddhabravat], essay writing based on Pali proverbs [kae kratoo thamm] and monastic discipline [vinai]. In 1912, three grades of advancement were set in the examinations - elementary [tree] for monks in their first five years of ordination, intermediate [toh] for those who had been monks 5–10 years and advanced [ayk] for monks of ten vassas and over. The nak thamm curriculum was adapted for the laity as thamma seuksa at the behest of the Supreme Patriarch Somdet Phra Luang Jinavorasirivattana from 1929 onwards.

Present day
Presently Phraphromuni [Chand Phromagutto](Pali Grade 9) of Wat Bowonniwet is the chief examiner for the Sanam Luang Dhamma Studies Examination Curriculum and presides over a national examination board for this curriculum. The board is authorized as an organ of the Thai Sangha Supreme Council and hence the whole monastic community of Thailand. Within Thailand, hundreds of thousands take the examinations annually. Since it is encouraged for the men ordaining for the Buddhist lent take the elementary nak thamm examination before leaving the robe, the elementary nak thamm examinations are generally held in mid-October - the intermediate and advanced nak thamm and all thamma seuksa examinations being held in mid-November.

International uptake
One initiative of the 19th Supreme Patriarch Somdej Phra Nyanasamvara Suvaddhana was to have many of the thamma seuksa texts and examinations translated into English, bearing in mind the nurture of Thai children growing up outside Thailand. Thamma seuksa examinations are now held in Europe, the northern states of Malaysia, Indonesia, Hong Kong, Australia and the United States of America. The Dhammakaya Movement in the United Kingdom was the first to introduce thamma seuksa examinations to Europe in 2006. The different continents of the world each have a particular time of the year when they organize their thamma seuksa examinations to allow invigilators from Thailand to make the rounds. For Europe the examinations are held in mid-June.

References

See also
 Pāli Canon
 Pariyatti
 Dhamma Society Fund
 Mahachulalongkornrajavidyalaya University
 Mahamakut Buddhist University
 International Buddhist Studies College
 List of Sāsana Azani recipients
 Tipitakadhara Tipitakakovida Selection Examinations
 Monastic examinations (Myanmar)
 Monastic schools in Myanmar
 Pirivena, monastic colleges in Sri Lanka 

Buddhism in Thailand